Rajula is a city and municipality in Amreli district in the Indian state of Gujarat. City was known as Rajgadh at the time of local ruler daha dhakhda.

Originally Rajula spread between Dholio Dunger and Piriyo Dungar, but has expanded beyond that area on all sides. Rajula has a big market yard facility. A small lake appears on the western side of the town near the dam.

Etymology : etymologically Rajula is Sanskrit word meaning ( राज  means rule + उल ula means can't bear something ) The city that can not bear rule Or city that can not bear depraved ruler.

Another sources claims that Rajula name derives from princess rajulakumari also known as rajamati , wife of lord Neminath famous tirthkara in Jainism.

One theory also suggests that the name rajula derives from indoscythian King Rajuvula whose empire was from Mathura to shore of saurashtra.

Historically city was under dhakhda rulers. At time of gohilwad vakhatsinh ji annexed Rajula. At around 1800 AD gaekwad ruled amreli, at time there was British governance established, and then navab of Junagadh captured babariyawad (42 villages including Rajula). But by proving its name Rajula (and Mangrol) got independence by 1 November 1947 from junagadh and merged with amreli district of Saurashtra.

Demographics 
As of the 2001 Indian census, Rajula had a population of approximately 80,393. Females constituted 49% of the population. Rajula has an average literacy rate of 64%, higher than the national average of 59.5%, with male literacy at 72% and female, 55%. In Rajula, 15% of the population is under 6 years of age.

Temples and tourist attractions 

Kumbhnath Sukhnath temple is situated near Rajula. It is an old temple of Shiva. The shivlinga of Shiva was made by the brothers Bhima and Yudhishthira. Fairs are generally organised on the festivals of Raksha Bandhan and Krishna Janmashtami. The temple is situated at the bank of Ghano river, a tributary of Dhatarwadi river.

Other temples include Bhidbhanjan, Ram Mandir, Goverdhannathji Ni Haveli, Samudrimataji Mandir, Sanyas Ashram, Gayatrijinu Mandir, Holia Hanumanji Nu Mandir, Ambama Nu Mandir, and Sankheshwarimataji Mandir.

Dhatarwadi riverside, opposite to the Kumbhnath Temple, is a tourist attraction.

Chachudeshwar Mahadev Temple, about 10 km from the city, is in a coastal area at which the river Dhatarwadi meets the Arabian sea.

Education 

The Saraswati group of schools includes Saraswati Vidyalaya, Saraswati Day School, and Saraswati Science School.

Swa. Khodabapa Education Trust and Rajula Sanchalit Sanskruti Vidhyalay and Sanskruti English medium schools are located at Jafrabad Road and have provided education since 2003.

St. Thomas High School is managed by a Christian Catholic group. It is located at Chataddiya Road. Shree Swaminarayan Gurukul is a well-known school and the first private school in the city located at Chataddiya Road, providing education services since 1996.

The city hosts primary schools and bal mandirs. Gandhi mandir is managed by Shri Rajula Seva Mandal. The high school is Shree Jivanlal Anandaji Sanghavi & Shree T.J.B.S. Girls' School is located here. Rajula Education Trust's Smt. Hiralaxmi Bhaidas Sanghavi Mahila Arts & Commerce College is also one of the colleges here. Separate schools, colleges and hostels for girls are available along with coeducational schools.

Calorx Public School is managed by Calorx Education and Research Foundation. It is located at Chataddiya Road.

In the year of 2016, Education Department (Government of Gujarat) and Gujarat Maritime Board (GMB) have established GMB Polytechnic, Rajula at Chhatdiya Village (approx. 3 km from Rajula bus stand) to impart technical education of diploma level for the surrounding 100 km.

Transport 
The city is well connected with rest of the country by railways, bus transport and sea transport to other major cities of Gujarat such as Rajkot, Jamnagar and Bhavnagar. Night sleeper coach private buses running from Una or Diu to major cities like Ahmedabad, Baroda, Surat and Mumbai pass through Rajula providing a pleasure journey from Rajula to these cities. Rajula is situated on national highway No. 51. This highway connects Bhavnagar with Somnath.

Economy 
The city has substantial rock quarries that export around the country. Its economy mainly depends on industries and agriculture. Crops such as groundnut, cotton, and onion are popular.

Port Pipavav is a busy and growing seaport. Pipavav Shipyard Limited, now Reliance Naval and Engineering Limited, is one of the India's largest shipbuilding and heavy industry companies.

Kovaya village, known for limestone mine reserves, has some of the largest cement manufacturing plants.

Hotels and restaurants 
There are many hotels available in Rajula and many restaurants where one can find both continental and Gujarati food.

Legislative assembly 
This assembly seat represents the following segments,

 Rajula Taluka–entire taluka except village–Rampara No-1
 Jafrabad Taluka
 Khambha Taluka (Part) Villages – Umariya, Dedan, Raningpara, Nava Malaknes, Borala, Babarpur, Kantala, Chakrava, Hanumanpur, Juna Malaknes, Nesdi No-2, Samadhiyala No-2, Jivapar, Munjiyasar, Trakuda, Vangadhara, Talda, Dadli, Dhundhavana, Pachapachiya, Salva, Pipariya, Rabarika, Ambaliyala, Jamka, Ningala No-2, Bhundani, Gorana, Katarpara, Barman Mota, Barman Nana

Total number of voters

Member of legislative assembly 

 2007 - Heerabhai solanki, Bharatiya Janata Party
 2012 - Heerabhai solanki, Gujarat Parivartan Party
 2017 - Amrishbhai der, Congress

Winners and runners-up in Rajula assembly elections

Election results 
2012

2017

Towns and villages in Rajula Taluka of Amreli district (as per Census 2011)

References 

 http://www.elections.in/gujarat/assembly-constituencies/rajula.html

Cities and towns in Amreli district